Terry Richard Mills (born December 21, 1967) is an American former professional basketball player who played as a power forward. He was a member of the Michigan Wolverines' 1989 National Collegiate Athletic Association (NCAA) Men's Division I Basketball Championship winning team before playing over a decade in the National Basketball Association (NBA).

College career
After a standout career at Romulus High School, Mills was named 1986 Mr. Basketball of Michigan. Bob Gibbons had Mills ranked #2 behind J. R. Reid in the national prep player ranking for that year.

Mills attended the University of Michigan where he helped the Wolverines win the 1989 NCAA Men's Division I Basketball Championship.

In January 2009, Mills participated in the 20th anniversary celebration of the 1989 National Championship team.  He recently completed his degree from Michigan, and is looking to break into the coaching profession.

PAOK
In 1990 summer, Mills signed professional contract with P.A.O.K. BC. After several friendly games which included a home game against Maccabi Tel Aviv B.C., Mills left the club. The reason was an argument with Kostas Politis, during a training in Spain.

NBA career
Mills was drafted in 1990 by the Milwaukee Bucks who later traded his rights to the Denver Nuggets for whom he played 17 games. Mills also played for the New Jersey Nets, Detroit Pistons, Miami Heat, and Indiana Pacers.  Although he played the power forward position, Mills became known for his 3-point shooting. Legendary Piston announcer George Blaha nicknamed him " Sugar Bear" for his "sweet" shooting stroke and "Three Mills" for his on-target three-point shooting.

Coaching career
Mills was the head coach of the International Basketball League's Macomb County Mustangs (of Center Line, Michigan) during the 2006 season.

Personal life
He is the cousin of former NBA power forward Grant Long, and the nephew of shooting guard John Long.

He is the radio color analyst for University of Michigan Basketball on the Michigan Sports Marketing Network.

Currently residing in Michigan, he is an active participant in amateur drag racing.

References

External links
NBA Player file
NBA statistics @ basketball-reference.com
NBA statistics @ basketballreference.com
University of Michigan Basketball Statistical Archive

1967 births
Living people
African-American basketball players
American men's basketball players
Basketball players from Michigan
Denver Nuggets players
Detroit Pistons players
Indiana Pacers players
McDonald's High School All-Americans
Miami Heat players
Michigan Wolverines men's basketball players
Milwaukee Bucks draft picks
New Jersey Nets players
P.A.O.K. BC players
Parade High School All-Americans (boys' basketball)
People from Romulus, Michigan
Power forwards (basketball)
Romulus Senior High School alumni
21st-century African-American people
20th-century African-American sportspeople